E 579 is a European B class road in Hungary, connecting the villages Görbeháza and Beregdaróc.

Route 
 
Görbeháza – Nyíregyháza – Vásárosnamény – Beregdaróc

References

External links 
 UN Economic Commission for Europe: Overall Map of E-road Network (2007)

International E-road network
Roads in Hungary